Spaunton is a hamlet and civil parish in the Ryedale district of North Yorkshire, England. At the 2011 the civil parish had a population of less than 100. Details are included in the civil parish of Lastingham. The name Spaunton derives from Old Norse and means a farmstead or settlement which had shingle roofs.

Spaunton is still the setting for a Court Leet. The court meets annually in October an decides on matters of encroachment onto the common land in the village and hands down fines to offenders. The full title of the court is the Manor of Spaunton Court Leet and Court Baron with View of Frankpledge.

Just after 9:00 pm on the 7 October 1943, a Lancaster bomber of No. 408 Squadron RCAF from RAF Linton-on-Ouse crashed into the village with a full load of ordnance. One of the bombs exploded and killed a civilian from the village, George Strickland, as he went to see what the noise was about. He is buried in Lastingham graveyard.

References

External links

Details of Spaunton's Court Leet

Villages in North Yorkshire
Civil parishes in North Yorkshire